"Childhood's End" is a song from Pink Floyd's 1972 album Obscured by Clouds. It was the last Pink Floyd song to be composed entirely by David Gilmour, as well as the last to feature lyrics written by him, until A Momentary Lapse of Reason in 1987. The song gets its title from the 1953 science-fiction novel of the same name by Arthur C. Clarke, though the theme of the song shares little with the story. The 2016 remixed version of "Childhood's End" which appears in The Early Years 1965–1972 box set was released as the second single to promote the box set in October 2016.

Live
"Childhood's End" was performed live during Pink Floyd's European tour in late 1972 and at a few shows in March 1973 on their next North American tour. The live versions usually featured a fairly long instrumental section not found in the studio version, with an exception being the last version played on 10 March 1973 at Kent State University, when they stuck to the studio arrangement. The live versions were also performed in F-sharp minor, a step higher than the studio version (E minor).  Nick Mason's Saucerful of Secrets resurrected the song for their 2019 and 2022 tours.

Personnel
David Gilmour – lead vocals, acoustic and electric guitars
Roger Waters – bass guitar
Richard Wright – Hammond organ, EMS VCS 3
Nick Mason – drums

References

Pink Floyd songs
1972 songs
Songs written by David Gilmour
Song recordings produced by David Gilmour
Song recordings produced by Roger Waters
Song recordings produced by Richard Wright (musician)
Song recordings produced by Nick Mason